The 2008 Waterford Senior Hurling Championship is the current championship of the Waterford Senior Hurling Championship having commenced on 27 April 2008.  There are 12 teams in the championship, structured into 3 groups of four teams.  From these groups, quarter finals, and semi-finals will be played with a county final being played in either Walsh Park or Fraher Field.  Ballyduff Upper are the defending champions having beaten Ballygunner in 2007.

De La Salle won their first Waterford Senior Hurling Championship after an 11 to 8 points win against Abbeyside played in very bad condition at Fraher Field, Dungarvan.

Group A

Standings

Matches

3rd and 4th Place Playoff

Group B

Standings

Matches

Group C

Standings

Matches

Relegation playoffs

Matches

Knockout phase

Matches

Round of 16

Quarter-finals

Semi-finals

Final

Top Scorer (up to round 3)

Championship statistics

Miscellaneous

 De La Salle win their first ever senior title.
 Abbeyside qualify for the final for the first time since 1969.

Waterford Senior Hurling Championship
Waterford Senior Hurling Championship